David Andrew Leo Fincher (born August 28, 1962) is an American film director. His films, mostly psychological thrillers,  have received 40 nominations at the Academy Awards, including three for him as Best Director.

Born in Denver, Colorado, Fincher was interested in filmmaking at an early age. In 1986, Fincher co-founded Propaganda Films, a film and music video production company. He then directed numerous music videos, most notably Madonna's "Express Yourself" in 1989 and "Vogue" in 1990, both of which won him the MTV Video Music Award for Best Direction. He made his feature film debut with Alien 3 (1992), and gained acclaim with Seven (1995), The Game (1997), Fight Club (1999), Panic Room (2002), and Zodiac (2007). 

He received greater success and Academy Award for Best Director nominations for The Curious Case of Benjamin Button (2008), The Social Network (2010), and Mank (2020). He also directed The Girl with the Dragon Tattoo (2011), and Gone Girl (2014).

In television series, he served as an executive producer and director for the Netflix series House of Cards (2013–18) and Mindhunter (2017–19), winning the Primetime Emmy Award for Outstanding Directing for a Drama Series for the pilot episode of House of Cards. He also served as an executive producer and co-creator with Tim Miller for their work, Love, Death & Robots, garnered several Emmys including Primetime Emmy Award for Outstanding Short Form Animated Program three times.

Early life
David Andrew Leo Fincher was born on August 28, 1962, in Denver, Colorado. His mother, Claire Mae (née Boettcher), was a mental health nurse from South Dakota who worked in drug addiction programs. His father, Howard Kelly "Jack" Fincher (December 6, 1930 – April 10, 2003), was an author from Oklahoma who worked as a reporter and bureau chief for Life magazine.  When he was two years old, the family moved to San Anselmo, California, where filmmaker George Lucas was one of his neighbors. Fincher was fascinated with filmmaking from the age of eight, when he began making films with an 8mm camera. He has said:In his teens, Fincher moved to Ashland, Oregon, where he attended Ashland High School. He directed plays and designed sets and lighting after school, and was a non-union projectionist at Varsity Theatre, as well as a production assistant at the local television news station, KOBI in Medford, Oregon. He supported himself by working as a busboy, dishwasher and fry cook.

Career

1983–1991: Early work
While establishing himself in the film industry, Fincher was employed at John Korty's studio as a production head. Gaining further experience, he became a visual effects producer, working on the animated Twice Upon a Time (1983) with George Lucas. He was hired by Industrial Light & Magic (ILM) in 1983 as an assistant cameraman and matte photographer and worked on Return of the Jedi (1983) and Indiana Jones and the Temple of Doom (1984). In 1984, he left ILM to direct a television commercial for the American Cancer Society that depicted a fetus smoking a cigarette. This quickly brought Fincher to the attention of producers in Los Angeles, and he was soon given the opportunity to direct Rick Springfield's 1985 documentary, The Beat of the Live Drum. Set on a directing career, Fincher co-founded production company Propaganda Films and started directing commercials and music videos. Other directors such as Michael Bay, Antoine Fuqua, Michel Gondry, Spike Jonze, Alex Proyas, Paul Rachman, Mark Romanek, Zack Snyder and Gore Verbinski also honed their skills at Propaganda Films before moving on to feature films.

Fincher directed TV commercials for many companies including Levi's, Converse, Nike, Pepsi, Revlon, Sony, Coca-Cola and Chanel, although he loathed doing them. Starting in 1984, Fincher began his foray into music videos. He directed videos for various artists including singer-songwriters Rick Springfield, Don Henley, Martha Davis, Paula Abdul, rock band the Outfield, and R&B singer Jermaine Stewart. Fincher's 1990 music video for "Freedom! '90" was one of the most successful for George Michael. In addition, he directed Michael Jackson's "Who Is It", Aerosmith's "Janie's Got A Gun" and Billy Idol's "Cradle of Love". For Madonna, he directed some of her iconic music videos: "Express Yourself", "Oh Father", "Vogue" and "Bad Girl". Between 1984 and 1993, Fincher was credited as a director for 53 music videos. He referred to the production of music videos as his own "film school", in which he learned how to work efficiently within a small budget and time frame.

1992–2000: Breakthrough
In 1990, 20th Century Fox hired Fincher to replace Vincent Ward as the director for the science-fiction horror Alien 3 (1992), his film directorial debut. It was the third installment in the Alien franchise starring Sigourney Weaver. The film was released in May 1992 to a mixed reception from critics and was considered weaker than the preceding films. From the beginning, Alien 3 was hampered by studio intervention and several abandoned scripts. Peter Travers of the Rolling Stone called the film "bold and haunting", despite the "struggle of nine writers" and "studio interference". The film received an Academy Award nomination for Best Visual Effects. Years later, Fincher publicly expressed his dismay and subsequently disowned the film. In the book Director's Cut: Picturing Hollywood in the 21st Century, Fincher blames the producers for their lack of trust in him. In an interview with The Guardian in 2009, he stated, "No one hated it more than me; to this day, no one hates it more than me."

After this critical disappointment, Fincher eschewed reading film scripts or directing another project. He briefly retreated to directing commercials and music videos, including the video for the song "Love Is Strong" by the Rolling Stones in 1994, which won the Grammy Award for Best Music Video. Shortly, Fincher decided to make a foray back into film. He read Andrew Kevin Walker's original screenplay for Seven (1995), which had been revised by Jeremiah Chechik, the director attached to the project at one point. Fincher expressed no interest in directing the revised version, so New Line Cinema agreed to keep the original ending. Starring Brad Pitt, Morgan Freeman, Gwyneth Paltrow, R. Lee Ermey, and Kevin Spacey, it tells the story of two detectives who attempt to identify a serial killer who bases his murders on the Christian seven deadly sins. Seven was positively received by film critics and was one of the highest-earning films of 1995, grossing more than $320 million worldwide. Writing for Sight and Sound, John Wrathall said it "stands as the most complex and disturbing entry in the serial killer genre since Manhunter" and Roger Ebert opined that Seven is "one of the darkest and most merciless films ever made in the Hollywood mainstream."

Following Seven, Fincher directed a music video for "6th Avenue Heartache" by the Wallflowers and went on to direct his third feature film, the mystery thriller The Game (1997), written by the duo John Brancato and Michael Ferris. Fincher also hired Seven screenwriter Andrew Kevin Walker to contribute and polish the script. Filmed on location in San Francisco, the story follows an investment banker, played by Michael Douglas, who receives an unusual gift from his younger brother (Sean Penn), where he becomes involved in a "game" that integrates with his everyday life, making him unable to differentiate between game and reality. Almar Haflidason of the BBC was critical of the ending, but praised the visuals—"Fincher does a marvelous job of turning ordinary city locations into frightening backdrops, where every corner turned is another step into the unknown". Upon The Game's release in September 1997, the film received generally favorable reviews but performed moderately at the box office. The Game was later included in the Criterion Collection.

In August 1997, Fincher agreed to direct Fight Club, based on the 1996 novel of the same name by Chuck Palahniuk. It was his second film with 20th Century Fox after the troubled production of Alien 3. Starring Brad Pitt, Edward Norton and Helena Bonham Carter, the film is about a nameless office worker suffering from insomnia, who meets a salesman, and together form an underground fighting club as a form of therapy. Fox struggled with the marketing of the film, and were concerned that it would have a limited audience. Fight Club premiered on October 15, 1999 in the United States to a polarized response and modest box office success; the film grossed $100.9 million against a budget of $63 million. Initially, many critics thought the film was "a violent and dangerous express train of masochism and aggression." However, in following years, Fight Club became a cult favorite and gained acknowledgement for its multilayered themes; the film has been the source of critical analysis from academics and film critics.

In 1999, Fincher was shortlisted by Columbia Pictures, as one of the potential directors to helm Spider-Man (2002), a live-action adaptation of the fictional comic-book character of the same name. Fincher's pitch featured an older, experienced version of the titular character in his adult years and the post-adolescent portion of his life as a photographer and his crime-fighting double life as a vigilante, with a more grounded, character-driven and drama-oriented tone and direction. Fincher later said of his pitch, "I went in and told them what I might be interested in doing, and they hated it". Sam Raimi was chosen as director instead.

2001–2010: Continued success

In 2001, Fincher served as an executive producer for the first season of The Hire, a series of short films to promote BMW automobiles. The films were released on the internet in 2001. Next in 2002, Fincher returned to another feature film, a thriller titled Panic Room. The story follows a single mother and her daughter who hide in a safe room of their new home, during a home invasion by a trio. Starring Jodie Foster (who replaced Nicole Kidman), Forest Whitaker, Kristen Stewart, Dwight Yoakam, and Jared Leto, it was theatrically released on March 29, 2002, after a month delay, to critical acclaim and commercial success. In North America, the film earned $96.4 million. In other countries, it grossed $100 million for a worldwide $196.4 million. Mick LaSalle of the San Francisco Chronicle praised the filmmakers for their "fair degree of ingenuity... for 88 minutes of excitement" and the convincing performance given by Foster. Fincher acknowledged Panic Room for being more mainstream, describing the film, "It's supposed to be a popcorn movie—there are no great, overriding implications. It's just about survival."

Five years after Panic Room, Fincher returned on March 2, 2007, with Zodiac, a thriller based on Robert Graysmith's books about the search for the Zodiac, a real life serial murderer who terrorized communities between the late 1960s and early 1970s. Fincher first learned of the project after being approached by producer Brad Fischer; he was intrigued by the story due to his childhood personal experience. "The highway patrol had been following our school buses", he recalled. His father told him, "There's a serial killer who has killed four or five people... who's threatened to... shoot the children as they come off the bus." After extensive research on the case with fellow producers, Fincher formed a principal cast of Jake Gyllenhaal, Mark Ruffalo, Robert Downey Jr., Anthony Edwards and Brian Cox. It was the first of Fincher's films to be shot in digital, with a Thomson Viper FilmStream HD camera. However, high-speed film cameras were used for particular murder scenes. Zodiac was well received, appearing in more than two hundred top ten lists (only No Country for Old Men and There Will Be Blood appeared in more). However, the film struggled at the United States box office, earning $33 million, but did better overseas with a gross of $51.7 million. Worldwide, Zodiac was a moderate success. Despite a campaign by Paramount Pictures, the film did not receive any Academy Award or Golden Globe nominations.

In 2008, Fincher was attached to a film adaptation of the science-fiction novel, Rendezvous with Rama by Arthur C. Clarke, however, Fincher said the film is unlikely to go ahead due to problems with the script. His next project was The Curious Case of Benjamin Button (2008), an adaptation of F. Scott Fitzgerald's eponymous 1923 short story, about a man who is born as a seventy-year-old baby and ages in reverse. The romantic-drama marked Fincher's third collaboration with Brad Pitt, who stars opposite Cate Blanchett. The budget for the film was estimated to be $167 million, with very expensive visual effects utilized for Pitt's character. Filming started in November 2006 in New Orleans, taking advantage of Louisiana's film incentive. The film was theatrically released on December 25, 2008, in the United States to a commercial success and warm reception. Writing for the USA Today, Claudia Puig praises the "graceful and poignant" tale despite it being "overlong and not as emotionally involving as it could be". The film received thirteen Academy Award nominations, including Best Picture, Best Director for Fincher, Best Actor for Pitt, and Best Supporting Actress for Taraji P. Henson, and won three, for Best Art Direction, Best Makeup, and Best Visual Effects.

Fincher directed the 2010 film The Social Network, a biographical drama about Facebook founder, Mark Zuckerberg and his legal battles. The screenplay was written by Aaron Sorkin, who adapted it from the book The Accidental Billionaires. It stars Jesse Eisenberg as Zuckerberg, with a supporting cast of Andrew Garfield, Justin Timberlake, Armie Hammer and Max Minghella. Principal photography started in October 2009 in Cambridge, Massachusetts and the film was released one year later. The Social Network was also a commercial success, earning $224.9 million worldwide. At the 83rd Academy Awards, the film received eight nominations and won three awards; soundtrack composers Trent Reznor and Atticus Ross won for Best Original Score, and the other two awards were for Best Adapted Screenplay and Best Film Editing. The film also received awards for Best Motion Picture – Drama, Best Director, Best Screenplay, and Best Original Score at the 68th Golden Globe Awards. Critics including Roger Ebert, complimented the writing, describing the film as having "spellbinding dialogue. It makes an untellable story clear and fascinating".

2011–present: Established auteur 

In 2011, Fincher followed the success of The Social Network with The Girl with the Dragon Tattoo, a psychological thriller based on the novel by Swedish writer Stieg Larsson. Screenwriter Steven Zaillian spent three months analyzing the novel, writing notes and deleting elements to achieve a suitable running time. Featuring Daniel Craig as journalist Mikael Blomkvist and Rooney Mara as Lisbeth Salander, it follows Blomkvist's investigation to solve what happened to a woman from a wealthy family who disappeared four decades ago. To maintain the novel's setting, the film was primarily shot in Sweden. The soundtrack, composed by collaborators Trent Reznor and Atticus Ross, was described by A. O. Scott of The New York Times as, "unnerving and powerful". Upon the film's release in December, reviews were generally favorable, according to review aggregator Metacritic. Scott adds, "Mr. Fincher creates a persuasive ambience of political menace and moral despair". Philip French of The Guardian praises the "authentic, quirky detail" and faithful adaptation. The film received five Academy Award nominations, including Best Actress for Mara, and won the award for Best Film Editing. In 2012, Fincher signed a first look deal with Regency Enterprises.

In 2013, Fincher served as an executive producer for the Netflix television series House of Cards, a political thriller about a Congressman's quest for revenge, of which he also directed the first two episodes. The series received positive reviews, earning nine Primetime Emmy nominations, including Outstanding Drama Series. Fincher won the Primetime Emmy Award for Outstanding Directing for a Drama Series for the first episode. He also directed a music video for the first time since 2005, "Suit & Tie" by Justin Timberlake and Jay-Z, which won a Grammy Award for Best Music Video. Following the publication of Dave Cullen's book, Columbine, which was adapted into a play in 2014, Fincher considered making it into a film, however, the idea was dropped due to its sensitive nature. That same year, Fincher signed a deal with HBO for three television series - Utopia (an adaptation of the British series, to be written by Gillian Flynn), Shakedown, and Videosyncrazy. In August 2015, budget disputes between him and the network halted production. Three years later, in 2018, Utopia was picked up by Amazon Studios, with Gillian Flynn as creator.

Fincher directed Gone Girl (2014), an adaptation of Gillian Flynn's novel of the same name, starring Ben Affleck and Rosamund Pike. He even met with Flynn to discuss his interest in the project before a director was selected. Set in Missouri, the story begins as a mystery that follows the events surrounding Nick Dunne (Affleck), who becomes the prime suspect in the sudden disappearance of his wife Amy (Pike). A critical and commercial success, the film earned $369 million worldwide against a $61 million budget, making it Fincher's highest-grossing work to date. Writing for Salon magazine, Andrew O'Hehir praises the "tremendous ensemble cast who mesh marvelously", adding, "All the technical command of image, sound and production design for which Fincher is justly famous is here as well." Gone Girl garnered awards and nominations in a various categories; Pike earned an Academy Award nomination for Best Actress and Fincher received his third Golden Globe nomination for Best Director.Between 2016 and 2019, Fincher directed, produced and served as showrunner for another series, Mindhunter, starring Holt McCallany and Jonathan Groff. The series, based on the book Mind Hunter: Inside the FBI's Elite Serial Crime Unit, debuted on Netflix worldwide on October 13, 2017. In June 2017, Jim Gianopulos of Paramount Pictures announced that a sequel to World War Z was "in advanced development" with Fincher and Brad Pitt. Producers Dede Gardner and Jeremy Kleiner said that Fincher would begin directing it in June 2019. However, in February 2019, Paramount cancelled the project. As of 2019, Fincher serves as an executive producer for Love, Death & Robots, an animated science-fiction web series for Netflix. In July 2019, Fincher signed on to direct Mank, a biopic about Citizen Kane screenwriter Herman J. Mankiewicz. Mank received a limited theatrical release on November 13, 2020, and was made available on Netflix on December 4. Gary Oldman portrayed Mankiewicz, and the film received ten Academy Award nominations, winning two for Best Cinematography and Best Production Design.

Fincher also served as an executive producer on a series titled Voir (2021) for Netflix. In 2022, Fincher made his first foray in animation directing an episode for the third season of Love, Death & Robots. The episode is titled "Bad Travelling" and was written by Seven screenwriter Andrew Kevin Walker.

Future projects 
In late 2019, Fincher began developing a television prequel to the 1974 film Chinatown with its screenwriter Robert Towne, and he has also expressed interest in eventually making a third season of Mindhunter, which was put on indefinite hold in 2020. In 2023, Fincher confirmed that Netflix will not be making a third season of Mindhunter, saying "I’m very proud of the first two seasons. But it’s a very expensive show and, in the eyes of Netflix, we didn’t attract enough of an audience to justify such an investment [for Season 3]."

In February 2021, it was reported that Fincher will direct an adaptation of the graphic novel The Killer for Netflix, with Andrew Kevin Walker writing the screenplay and Michael Fassbender attached to star.

Filmmaking style and techniques

Influences 
Fincher did not attend film school, but he cites Alfred Hitchcock as a major influence, as well as filmmakers Martin Scorsese, Stanley Kubrick, George Roy Hill and Alan J. Pakula. His personal favorite films include: All the President's Men (1976), Taxi Driver (1976), Rear Window (1954), Zelig (1983), Paper Moon (1973), Lawrence of Arabia (1962), American Graffiti (1973), The Graduate (1967), Jaws (1975) and Close Encounters of the Third Kind (1977). Fincher suggested that Panic Room is a combination of "Rear Window meets Straw Dogs (1971)". For Seven, Fincher and cinematographer Darius Khondji were inspired by films The French Connection (1971) and Klute (1971), as well as the work by photographer Robert Frank. He has cited graphic designer Saul Bass as an inspiration for his own film title sequences; Bass designed many of them for prominent directors including Hitchcock and Stanley Kubrick.

Method 
Fincher's filmmaking process always begins with extensive research and preparation, although he said the process is different every time. "I enjoy reading a script that you can see in your head, and then I enjoy the casting and I enjoy the rehearsal, and I enjoy all the meetings about what it should be, what it could be, what it might be", he said. Fincher admits he has autocratic tendencies and likes to micro-manage every part of the production. “He was always a rebel... Always challenging the status quo,” colleague Sigurjon Sighvatsson said.

Known for his meticulous eye for detail and perfectionist qualities, Fincher performs thorough research when casting actors to ensure their suitability for the part. "He's really good at finding the one detail that was missed. He knows more than anybody", said colleague Max Daly. "He's just scary smart, sort of smarter than everyone else in the room", said producer Laura Ziskin. In addition, the director approaches editing like "intricate mathematical problems". Zodiac editor, Angus Wall, said it was like "putting together a Swiss watch... All the pieces are so beautifully machined. He's incredibly specific. He never settles. And there's a purity that shows in his work."

When working with actors, Fincher demands a grueling retake after retake to capture a scene perfectly. For instance, the Zodiac cast-members were required to do an upward of seventy takes for certain scenes, much to the displeasure of Jake Gyllenhaal. Rooney Mara had to endure ninety-nine takes for a scene in The Social Network, and said that the director enjoys challenging people. Gone Girl averaged fifty takes per scene. In one of the episodes for Mindhunter, it was reported that a nine-minute scene took eleven hours to shoot. When asked about this method, Fincher said "I hate earnestness in performance... usually by Take 17 the earnestness is gone", adding that he wants a scene to be as natural and authentic as possible. Some actors appreciate this approach, arguing that the subtle adjustments have a big difference in the way a scene is carried. Others have been critical however, "[Fincher] wants puppets. He doesn't want actors that are creative", said R. Lee Ermey.

He prefers shooting with Red digital cameras, under natural or pre-existing light conditions rather than using elaborate light setups. Fincher is also known to use computer-generated imagery, which is mostly unnoticeable to the viewer. He does not normally use hand-held cameras during filming, instead preferring cameras on a tripod. Fincher said, "Handheld has a powerful psychological stranglehold. It means something specific and I don't want to cloud what's going on with too much meaning." He has also experimented with the disembodied camera movement, notably in Panic Room, where the camera glides around the house to give the impression of surveillance by an unseen observer.

Style and themes 
One element of Fincher's visual style is the specific way in which he uses tilt, pan and track in the camera movements. When a character is in motion or expressing emotions, the camera moves at the exact same speed and direction as their body. The movements are choreographed precisely between the actors and camera operators. The resulting effect helps the audience connect with the character to understand their feelings. Similarly, in his music videos, Fincher appreciated that the visuals should enhance the listening experience. He would cut around the vocals, and let the choreography finish before cutting the shot. Camera movements are also synchronized to the beat of the music.

Some regard Fincher as an auteur filmmaker, although he dislikes being associated with that term. Much of his work is influenced by classical film noir and neo noir genres. Fincher's visual style also includes using monochromatic and desaturated colors of blue, green and yellow, representing the world that the characters are in. In The Girl with the Dragon Tattoo, Fincher uses heavy desaturation for certain scenes, and increases or decreases the effect based on the story or characters emotions. Erik Messerschmidt, cinematographer for Mindhunter explains the color palette, "The show has a desaturated green-yellow look... [it] helps give the show its period feel". He states the effect is achieved through production design, costumes and filming locations—not necessarily through lighting used on set. Fincher also favors detailed and pronounced shadows, as well as using minimal light. When asked about his use of dim lighting, he said bright lights make the color of skin appear unnatural. "That's the way the world looks to me", he said.

Fincher has explored themes of martyrdom, alienation and dehumanization of modern culture. In addition to the wider themes of good and evil, his characters are often troubled, discontented and flawed, unable to socialize and suffer from loneliness. In Seven, Zodiac and The Social Network, themes of pressure and obsession are explored, leading to the character's downfall. Quoting historian Frank Krutnik, the writer Piers McCarthy, argues, "that the protagonists of these films are not totally in control of their actions but are subject to darker, inner impulses". In a 2017 interview, Fincher explained his fascination of sinister themes, "There was always a house in any neighborhood that I ever lived in that all the kids on the street wondered, “What are those people up to?” We sort of attach the sinister to the mundane in order to make things interesting... I think it's also because in order for something to be evil, it almost has to cloak itself as something else." Fincher once stated, "I think people are perverts. I've maintained that. That's the foundation of my career."

Collaborators 
Over the course of his career, the director has shown loyalty to his performers and production crew. As a music video director, he collaborated with Paula Abdul five times, and Madonna and Rick Springfield four times each. Once he made the transition to feature films, he cast Brad Pitt in three of them. "On-screen and off-screen, Brad's the ultimate guy... He has such a great ease with who he is", Fincher remarked. Bob Stephenson, Michael Massee, Christopher John Fields, John Getz, Elias Koteas, Zach Grenier, Charles Dance, Rooney Mara, Jared Leto, and Richmond Arquette have also appeared in at least two of his films.

Fight Club was scored by the Dust Brothers, who at that point had never scored for a film. Describing their working relationship with Fincher, they said he "was not hanging over our shoulders telling us what to do"; the only direction he gave was to make the music sound as great as the score from The Graduate (1967). Trent Reznor and Atticus Ross composed the music for The Social Network, The Girl with the Dragon Tattoo, Gone Girl, and Mank. The musicians describe their working relationship as "collaborative, respectful and inspiring" although it "hasn't gotten any easier". Fincher even used a remix of Reznor's Nine Inch Nails song "Closer" in the opening credits of Seven. Howard Shore composed the scores for three films; Seven, The Game and Panic Room.

Darius Khondji and Jeff Cronenweth have served as cinematographers for Fincher's films. Khondji said, "Fincher deserves a lot of credit. It was his influence that pushed me to experiment and got me as far as I did". The director has hired sound designer Ren Klyce in all his films since 1995, whom Fincher trusts "implicitly". Fincher has also worked with film editor Angus Wall since 1988, who has worked on seven of his films, five of which he has edited. Donald Graham Burt has served as a production designer for six films and Bob Wagner has served as an assistant director for six. Lastly, casting director Laray Mayfield has worked with Fincher for more than twenty years. In a 2010 interview, Fincher said, "you don't have to love all of your co-collaborators, but you do have to respect them. And when you do, when you realize that people bring stuff to the table that's not necessarily your experience, but if you allow yourself to relate to it, it can enrich the buffet that you're going to bring with you into the editing room."

Personal life
Fincher married model Donya Fiorentino (sister of actress Linda Fiorentino) in 1990 and divorced in 1995. They have one daughter together, born in 1994, Phelix Imogen. In 1996, he married producer Ceán Chaffin.

Filmography

Selected television work
 House of Cards (2013–2018)
 Mindhunter (2017–2019)
 Love, Death & Robots (2019–present)
 Voir (2021)

Selected music videos
 "Englishman in New York", Sting (1987)
 "The End of the Innocence", Don Henley (1989)
 "Janie's Got a Gun", Aerosmith (1989)
 "Express Yourself", Madonna (1989)
 "Oh Father", Madonna (1989)
 "Freedom '90", George Michael (1990)
 "Vogue", Madonna (1990)
 "Bad Girl", Madonna (1993)
 "Who Is It?", Michael Jackson (1993)
 "Love Is Strong", The Rolling Stones (1994)
 "Judith", A Perfect Circle (2000)
 "Suit & Tie", Justin Timberlake feat. Jay-Z (2013)
Note: For a complete list, see main article.

Reception

Critical reception

Box office performance

Awards and recognition 

Tim Walker of The Independent praised Fincher's work, stating "His portrayals of the modern psyche have a power and precision that few film-makers can match." In 2003, Fincher was ranked 39th in The Guardian's 40 best directors. In 2012, The Guardian listed him again in their ranking of 23 best film directors in the world, applauding "his ability to sustain tone and tension". In 2016, Zodiac and The Social Network appeared in the BBC's 100 Greatest Films of the 21st Century list. In addition to films, Fincher has often been admired for producing some of the most creative music videos.

Directed Academy Award performances

References

Further reading

External links

David Fincher at MVDbase.com
David Fincher at Senses of Cinema: Great Directors Critical Database

|-
! colspan="3" style="background: #DAA520;" | National Board of Review
|-

! colspan="3" style="background: #DAA520;" | National Board of Review
|-

1962 births
Living people
American music video directors
Grammy Award winners
People from Ashland, Oregon
People from Denver
Best Director BAFTA Award winners
Best Director Golden Globe winners
American film producers
American television directors
Television producers from California
Primetime Emmy Award winners
Television commercial directors
People from San Anselmo, California
Film directors from California
Film producers from California
Horror film directors
Film directors from Colorado
Film directors from Oregon
Film producers from Oregon
Industrial Light & Magic people
American people of German descent
Television producers from Oregon
Postmodernist filmmakers